is a former Japanese football player.

Playing career
Isoda was born in Kyoto Prefecture on May 27, 1965. After graduating from Doshisha University, he joined NKK in 1988. Although he played in many matches, the club was disbanded at the end of the 1993 season. In 1994, he moved to the Japan Football League club Fujieda Blux (later Fukuoka Blux, Avispa Fukuoka). In 1995, he was a regular player and the club won the championship.  The club was promoted to the J1 League in 1996. However he did not play as much, and retired at the end of the 1996 season.

Club statistics

References

External links

1965 births
Living people
Doshisha University alumni
Association football people from Kyoto Prefecture
Japanese footballers
Japan Soccer League players
J1 League players
Japan Football League (1992–1998) players
NKK SC players
Avispa Fukuoka players
Association football defenders